Baba Zeyd (also Romanized as Bābā Zeyd; also known as Emām Zādeh, Emāmzādeh Bābā Zeyd, Imāmzādeh Bāba Zai, and Imāmzādeh Bāba Zaid) is a village in Malavi Rural District, in the Central District of Pol-e Dokhtar County, Lorestan Province, Iran. At the 2006 census, its population was 592, in 118 families.

References 

Towns and villages in Pol-e Dokhtar County